Chavakachcheri Hospital is a government hospital in Chavakachcheri, Sri Lanka. It is controlled by the provincial government in Jaffna. As of 2010 it had 111 beds. The hospital is sometimes called Chavakachcheri Base Hospital or Chavakachcheri District Hospital.

As well as general medical and surgical care the hospital provides a wide variety of healthcare services including diabetic, dentistry, obstetrics (ante-natal), oncology, ophthalmology, paediatrics, psychiatry and tuberculosis. The hospital also has an emergency department, an x-ray unit and a pathological laboratory.

In 2010 the hospital had 9,822 in-patient admissions, 125,003 out-patient visits and 20,352 clinic visits.

References

External links
 Base Hospital Chavakachcheri, Jaffna Regional Directorate of Health Services

Hospital
Hospitals in Jaffna District
Provincial government hospitals in Sri Lanka